= Hajrah =

Saudi Arabian town

Coordinates: 20°14′N 41°03′E

- Interactive map of Hajrah

Hajrah (Arabic: الحجرة) is a town about 150 km (93 mi) south-east of Jeddah in Saudi Arabia.

Muhammad ventured here to complete his journey and mission to spread Islam. Although he was exiled from Mecca, he returned shortly after amassing followers in Hajrah.

== See also ==
- List of cities and towns in Saudi Arabia
